History of Civilization in Poland is a cycle of twelve oil sketches on canvas and wood, created by the Polish nominal painter Jan Matejko in 1889 with accompanying commentaries. The originals are kept at the Museum of the Royal Castle, Warsaw.

History
Matejko created his series along with an accompanying commentary in part to fulfill a set of research requirements for his new academic title, the degree of Doctor of Philosophy honoris causa, which he received from the Jagiellonian University. Much of the imagery of the cycle has been inspired by the lectures of historian Józef Szujski which Matejko might have attended around 1877–1878, or read in print afterward.

The works in the series
The cycle consists of the following paintings:

References

1888 paintings
1889 paintings
Paintings by Jan Matejko
Paintings in the collection of the Royal Castle, Warsaw